Here I Am is the debut solo album by M2M member, Marion Ravn, released on June 6, 2005. Ravn co-wrote all but one of the songs with several well-known musicians. She played both acoustic and electric guitars as well as the piano and provided background vocals on a number of songs. The album showed her transition from her past M2M pop sound to a dark hard-rock sound. Her musical transition was well received by critics internationally.

The album debuted at No. 6 in her native Norway and at No. 13 in Japan and was highly successful in countries such as Thailand, Singapore, Malaysia, and the Philippines. Raven went on a tour of Southeast Asian countries to promote the album in late 2005. However, lack of promotion on Atlantic Records part and delays in releasing the album in the U.S. prompted Ravn to leave the music company.

The album was released in the United States in 2007, with a different track listing and title, Set Me Free, incorporating new and old songs, including an acoustic version of "Let Me Introduce Myself" and the re-recorded version of "Heads Will Roll," which preceded the album in October 2006, as part of the Heads Will Roll EP.

Raven talked about "13 Days" and other songs on Here I Am in an interview in 2005,

Background and composition 
Ravn rose to prominence as half of the musical duo M2M, alongside Marit Larsen. In 2002, M2M disbanded after the release of two albums and some international success. Following the break-up, M2M's American record label, Atlantic Records, approached Ravn with an offer for a solo record contract. In later interviews, she explained that she would otherwise not have been able to work with others until at least 2005, as she had a pre-existing contract with the label. Her debut album was reported to have a budget of NOK 7.3 million, or approximately one million US dollars at the time.

In the autumn of 2002, Ravn began recording songs for her solo project with Norwegian producer Ole Evenrud at his studio in Halden; these songs were ultimately never released. Ravn was introduced to Max Martin by her then-manager Thomas Erdtman. Martin believed that he had songs that could be suitable for Ravn, but soon they started collaborating on the album's music and lyrics. Songwriting and recording started in January 2003 at Metronome in Stockholm and the album was reported to be finished by early January 2004. In an interview to BON, Ravn stated that they "had no fixed date by which we had to be finished. We could hold on as long as we felt necessary."

Several other songwriters joined the project, including Nikki Sixx from Mötley Crüe (whom Ravn met in June 2004 when his band Brides of Destruction performed in Norway), Art Alexakis from Everclear (who sings on "At The End Of The Day"), Jimmy Harry, as well as Canadian singer-songwriter Chantal Kreviazuk and Raine Maida from the band Our Lady Peace.

Singles
 "End of Me" was the first single from the album to be released exclusively in Southeast Asia. It peaked at No. 4 on MTV Asia's video hitlist and was a top 10 song in Malaysia and Singapore.
 "Break You" was released in Mexico, Japan, Sweden and Norway. It went No. 1 in Japan  and Indonesia and claimed the No. 9 spot in Norway.
 "Here I Am" was the album's title track, and third single, that was only officially released in Norway, around the same time "Break You" was released. It peaked at No. 20 on the official Norwegian charts and reached No. 3 on the TV2 Music Chart. Raven performed the song live in the Nordic Music Awards. The music video of "Here I Am" featured pictures of Raven's grandfather when he was a young man.
 "Little by Little", the fifth track of the album, was released as a radio-only single in Asia.

Track listing
Japan and Scandinavia release track listing

The Japanese release also has a bonus DVD with 'Break You' and 'Here I Am' music videos.

Southeast Asia and Taiwan'' releases track listing

 The Here I Am'' DVD Limited Edition for Taiwan was released in 2006 only. It featured the making of "End Of Me" and the "End Of Me" music video.

Bonus tracks and B-Sides:
 "Surfing the Sun" (Marion Raven, Nikki Sixx, James Michael) 3:53 *Japanese Bonus Track
 "There I Said It" (Marion Raven, Max Martin, Rami) 3:48 *Single B-Side for Swedish "Break You" and Norwegian "Here I Am" singles

Tracks that did not make it into the final cut of the album were,"Forgot His Name", "Brand New Me", "Disconnected", "Have Mercy", "Bittersweet" and "Gutter". Little is known about these songs, but a track called 'Get Over Me' leaked to the web in 2006.

Reception

 The album sold over 135,000 copies in Asia in its first three months.
 On the online version of the Singapore newspaper, The New Paper, music reviewer Seto Nu-Wen wrote, "Her (Raven's) music is more heartfelt than contrived, thus avoiding the commercial trappings of your average teenage punk-rock debut."
 On her "Here I Am" tour across Asia, Japan and Scandinavia, MTV Asia praised Raven on shedding the cuteness of M2M and sporting an assertive voice of vengeful yet positive tunes backed with a strong radio-friendly pop-rock vibe.
 At the end of 2005, Raven's singles "End Of Me" and "Break You" were at No. 54 and No. 69 respectively on MTV Asia's year end top 100 countdown, with "End Of Me" beating songs like "Ghost Of You" (No. 57) and "Misunderstood" (No. 58), by My Chemical Romance and Robbie Williams respectively.

Chart performance

Charts

Credits

 Marion Raven — Guitar (Acoustic), Guitar (Electric), Writer, Piano, Vocals, Vocals (background)
 Allen Kovac — Management
 Max Martin — Guitar, Writer, Producer, Programming, Vocals (background), Engineer, Instrumentation
 Steve Thompson — Arranger, Producer, String Arrangements, Mixing
 Lukasz "Doctor Luke" - Gottwald Instrumentation
 Hans Akeson, Ulrika Frankmar, Elisabeth Arnberg Ranmo, Håkan Roos — Viola
 Art Alexakis — Guitar, Vocals
 Andreas Andersson, Mikael Sjogren, Bo Soderstrom, Martin Stensson, Torbjorn Bernhardsson, Hanna Göran, Svein H. Martinsen — Violin
 Monica Jönsson, Astrid Lindell, Kati Raitinen — Cello
 Tomas Andersson — Guitar, Violin
 Kenny Aronoff — Percussion, Drums
 Richard Nettermalm, Johan Reivén — Drums
 John Degrazio — Guitar (Acoustic), Guitar (Electric)
 John Deley — Piano, Strings, Keyboards, Programming
 Peter Svensson — Guitar
 Liz Barrett — Art Direction
 P.R. Brown — Design, Photography
 Dana Marasca — Stylist
 Andrew Feigenbaum, Craig Kallman, Craig Rosen — A&R
 Janne Hansson — String Engineer
 Michael Ilbert — Engineer, Digital Editing, Mixing
 Henrik, Ulf — Janson String Arrangements
 Jesse Levy — String Arrangements
 George Marino — Mastering
 Mike Plotnikoff — Engineer, Mixing
 Bryan Russell — Assistant Engineer, Mixing Assistant
 Jamie Siegel — Programming, Engineer, Pre-Production

References

2005 debut albums
Albums produced by Dr. Luke
Albums produced by Max Martin
Albums produced by Rami Yacoub
Marion Raven albums